Unplugged is the first live album by American singer Alicia Keys. It was released on October 7, 2005 by J Records. Recorded as part of the television program MTV Unplugged on July 4, 2005 at the Brooklyn Academy of Music, the album includes songs from her first two studio albums Songs in A Minor (2001) and The Diary of Alicia Keys (2003).

Upon its release, Unplugged received generally favorable reviews from critics. It debuted atop the US Billboard 200 with first-week sales of 196,000 copies, becoming the highest debut for an MTV Unplugged album since Nirvana's MTV Unplugged in New York (1994) and the first Unplugged by a female artist to debut at number one. The album has sold over one million copies in the United States and over 1.5 million copies worldwide. Additionally, it was nominated for various awards, including the Grammy Award for Best R&B Album. It produced two singles–"Unbreakable", which peaked at number 34 on the US Billboard Hot 100 and number four on the US Hot R&B/Hip-Hop Songs, and "Every Little Bit Hurts".

Singles
"Unbreakable" was released as the lead single from Unplugged on September 6, 2005. It peaked at number 34 on the US Billboard Hot 100 and became Keys' sixth Hot R&B/Hip-Hop Songs top-ten single, peaking at number four. Two music videos were produced for the song–the Unplugged version from the album's DVD, and the BET version directed by Justin Francis. The song was nominated for Grammy Awards for Best Female R&B Vocal Performance and Best R&B Song, and a Soul Train Music Award for Best R&B/Soul Single – Female, winning NAACP Image Awards for Outstanding Song and Outstanding Music Video, and a BMI Urban Award.

"Every Little Bit Hurts", the cover of Brenda Holloway's song of the same title, was released as the second and final single on January 17, 2006. Unlike "Unbreakable", it failed to enter any charts, both in the United States and internationally. Its accompanying music video, directed by Francis, premiered on January 17 on BET's 106 & Park.

Critical reception

Upon its release, the album received generally positive reviews from most music critics, based on an aggregate score of 65/100 from Metacritic. E! Online gave the album an A− and said of Alicia Keys: "She might be unplugged--but she's still electrifying." Entertainment Weekly said the album "largely leaves Keys' runaway careerism in the dressing room, where it belongs." Blender gave it four stars out of five and called it "a stellar set." Q gave the album four stars out of five and said it "stands as an apt reminder that she is the finest soul talent of her generation." Billboard gave it a favorable review and said, "This self-assured, illuminating 'MTV Unplugged' performance underscores Keys' boundless passion for her craft." Los Angeles Times gave it three stars out of four and said, "The problems in this 72-minute package come chiefly when the exquisite singer-songwriter moves to what you'd think would be the creative heart of the album: material that isn't on her earlier CDs." Stylus Magazine gave it a B− and stated, "I’m definitely recommending Unplugged--with reservations, but it’s still a recommendation--but damn, I just wish the fun Keys seems to have on stage would translate more clearly to record."

Other critics were more ambivalent. Rolling Stone gave it three stars out of five and said the album "bursts with sweet soul that seems to feed off the adoring crowd." Allmusic gave it two and a half stars out of five and stated, "Over these rhythmic vamps, Keys does have some impressive vocal runs where she departs from the original melody and glides by on the sheer sound of her voice, but when the songs are reduced to their bare essence, her vocalizing doesn't become a way of telling a story, it becomes the reason she's playing music in the first place." Neumu gave it four stars out of ten and called it "just another bloated arena show." Uncut gave it two stars out of five and said, "Keys hasn't the charisma to indulge in the inter-song banter here, which breaks up any soulful flow that might develop despite her sharp, hectoring vocals."

Accolades

|-
! scope="row" rowspan="4"| 2006
| rowspan="4"| Grammy Award
| Best R&B Album
| Unplugged
| 
| rowspan="4"| 
|-
| Best Traditional R&B Vocal Performance
| "If I Was Your Woman"
| 
|-
| Best Female R&B Vocal Performance
| rowspan="4"| "Unbreakable"
| 
|-
| Best R&B Song
| 
|-
! scope="row" rowspan="4"| 2006
| rowspan="4"| NAACP Image Award
| Outstanding Song
| 
| rowspan="4"| 
|-
| Outstanding Music Video
| 
|-
| Outstanding Album
| Unplugged
| 
|-
| Outstanding Female Artist
| Alicia Keys
| 
|-
! scope="row"| 2006
| Soul Train Music Award
| Best R&B/Soul Single – Female
| "Unbreakable"
| 
| 
|-
! scope="row"| 2006
| Edison Award
| DVD Internationaal
| Unplugged
| 
| 
|-
! scope="row"| 2007
| BMI Urban Award
| Award Winning Song
| "Unbreakable"
| 
| 
|}

Commercial performance
Unplugged debuted atop the US Billboard 200 and Top R&B/Hip-Hop Albums, selling 196,000 copies in its first week and becoming her third consecutive number-one debut on the chart. In its second week, it registered a 58-percent sales drop to 83,000 copies, falling to number nine on the Billboard 200 and number three on the Top R&B/Hip-Hop Albums. The album left the top ten of the Billboard 200 in its third week, falling to number 12. By February 2006, Unplugged had sold over one million copies in the United States. Its CD was certified platinum by the Recording Industry Association of America (RIAA) on January 25, 2008 for shipping one million units, while its DVD was certified gold on November 22, 2005 for shipping 50,000 units.

Internationally, the CD reached the top ten in the Netherlands and Switzerland, and the top 20 in Belgium, France, Japan and Portugal, as well as peaking at number 17 on the European Top 100 Albums. The DVD peaked at number one in Spain, reaching the top ten in Australia, Austria, Belgium and the Netherlands. By February 2006, Unplugged had sold over 1.5 million copies worldwide.

Track listing

Sample credits
"A Woman's Worth" contains a sample of "Footsteps in the Dark" by The Isley Brothers (Ernest Isley, Christopher Jasper, Ronald Isley, Rudolph Isley, Marvin Isley, O'Kelly Isley Jr.)
"Unbreakable" contains a sample of Eddie Kendricks' "Intimate Friends" (Garry Glenn)
"Streets of New York (City Life)" contains a sample of "N.Y. State of Mind" by Nas (Eric Barrier, Nasir Jones, Chris Martin, William Griffin)
"You Don't Know My Name" contains a sample of "Let Me Prove My Love to You" by The Main Ingredient (J. R. Bailey, Mel Kent, Ken Williams)
"Love It or Leave It Alone" contains a sample of "Love Me or Leave Me Alone" by Brand Nubian (Lorenzo DeChalus, Derek Murphy, Charles Davis) and "Latoya" by Just-Ice (Kirk Khaleel, Joseph Williams)

Personnel
Credits adapted from the liner notes of Unplugged.

 Alicia Keys – vocals, arranger, executive producer
Alex Coletti – director, producer
Peter Edge – executive producer
Onree Gill – arranger
John Harris – audio recording 
Many Marroquin – mixing
Ann Mincieli – assistant engineer
Herb Powers – mastering
Jared Robbins – assistant engineer
Jeff Robinson – executive producer
Stewart White – assistant engineer

Charts

Weekly charts

Year-end charts

Certifications

Album

Video

Release history

See also
MTV Unplugged
List of Billboard 200 number-one albums of 2005
List of Billboard number-one R&B albums of 2005

References

External links
 Official website 

2005 live albums
2005 video albums
Alicia Keys video albums
J Records live albums
J Records video albums
Live video albums
Unplugged (Keys, Alicia album)
Alicia Keys live albums